Ralph Anthony Hill (December 26, 1908 – October 17, 1994) was an American runner. He set an American record over the mile in 1930 and won a silver medal in the 5000 m event at the 1932 Olympics.

Hill studied at the University of Oregon when competing in the 1932 Summer Olympics in Los Angeles on the 5000 m. In an exciting race on August 5, 1932, he came in second behind Lauri Lehtinen, with each runner recording a time of 14:30.0. The judges deliberated for an hour before deciding not to disqualify Lehtinen, as he had appeared to block Hill twice. Hill refused to file a protest, stating that he believed Lehtinen's obstruction was accidental. Lauri Virtanen came in third 14 seconds behind.

After college Hill made a career of farming near Klamath Falls. The local Henley High School renamed its football field in September 1992 after its alumnus Hill.

References

1908 births
1994 deaths
People from Klamath Falls, Oregon
American male long-distance runners
Olympic silver medalists for the United States in track and field
Athletes (track and field) at the 1932 Summer Olympics
Oregon Ducks men's track and field athletes
Track and field athletes from Oregon
Medalists at the 1932 Summer Olympics
Grand River Academy alumni